Ruskin Dam is a concrete gravity dam on the Stave River in Ruskin, British Columbia, Canada. The dam was completed in 1930 for the primary purpose of hydroelectric power generation. The dam created Hayward Lake, which supplies water to a 105 MW powerhouse and flooded the Stave's former lower canyon, which ended in a small waterfall approximately where the dam is today.

Background
Ruskin Dam was constructed along with the Western Canada Power Company's hydroelectric development of the Stave Valley. Stave Falls Dam was completed in 1912 and Alouette Dam, the third dam in the system, in 1928. In November 1930, the dam was inaugurated and local businessmen and politicians celebrated by dining in its powerhouse. Only two generators were operational at first and the third was added in 1950. The first superintendent of Stave Falls Dam was the namesake for Hayward Lake. In 1961, when the provincial government took over the BC Electric Company, the dam became the property of BC Hydro, a Crown corporation.

Upgrade
Beginning in 2012 and continuing until 2018, the dam and its facilities are expected to undergo an C$800 million upgrade. The project includes replacing the generators, reinforcing the right bank of the dam, upgrading the intake and penstocks, replacing the spillway piers and gates and relocating the switchyard. The upgrades are aimed at bringing the dam and its facilities up to safety standards, improving their seismic performance and increasing their efficiency and life. Three new 38MW turbine-generators provide a slight capacity increase to 114MW.

Design
The dam creates a reservoir (Hayward Lake) with a  capacity and  surface area. The dam sits at the outlet of a  catchment area and the reservoir extends . The dam's spillway is an ogee-type and consists of seven radial gates. It has a  maximum discharge capacity. The dam's powerhouse is immediately adjacent on the river's eastern bank. It contains three 35 MW Francis turbine-generators and water is fed to each by a single penstock. Access to the powerhouse is by a truss bridge from the company offices on the west side of the river.

Operation
Ruskin Dam is part of the Alouette-Stave Falls-Ruskin Hydroelectric Complex. Upstream of the dam is the Stave Falls Dam and Powerhouse which has an installed capacity of 90 MW. At the end of the tunnel is a penstock which feeds the 8 MW Alouette Powerhouse on the western shore of Stave Lake approximately 8 km north of Stave Dam. Water released from Stave Falls Dam flows into Hayward Lake and is used by the Ruskin Dam for power generation.

In popular culture
The dam has been a filming location for the TV series The X-Files, MacGyver, Smallville, Dark Angel and the movie The Invisible. In Smallville episodes "Prototype", "Phantom" and  "Bizarro", it is referred to as "Reeves Dam", a homage to the late Superman actors George Reeves and Christopher Reeve.

See also

List of electrical generating stations in British Columbia

External links
Ruskin page, Maple Ridge Museum and Community Archives website
Flickr gallery "Ruskin", Maple Ridge Community Association

Further reading
Valley of the Stave, Charlie Miller, Hancock House Publishers Ltd., Surrey BC, 1981

References

Dams in British Columbia
Gravity dams
Hydroelectric power stations in British Columbia
Mission, British Columbia
Dams completed in 1930
BC Hydro
Publicly owned dams in Canada